Vladimir Zrnić (born 16 September 1953) is a Yugoslav weightlifter. He competed in the men's light heavyweight event at the 1980 Summer Olympics.

References

1953 births
Living people
Yugoslav male weightlifters
Olympic weightlifters of Yugoslavia
Weightlifters at the 1980 Summer Olympics
Place of birth missing (living people)